Canna bangii is a species of herb in the family Cannaceae. It is native to Peru and Bolivia.

Description
Plants to 4m tall. Leaves green, lower side more or less soft, with downy hairs. Inflorescences repeatedly branched with persistent floral bracts. Flowers erect, orange-red, 4–7 cm long, composed of 8 or more coloured parts; petals not reflexed, staminodes 3 or more.

Distribution 

Cultivation 
It is hardy to zone 10 and is frost tender. In the north latitudes it is in flower from August to October, and the seeds ripen in October. Rarely available in cultivation.

References

External links
 Zip Code Zoo
 Distribution of C. bangii

bangii